Luis Alberto Fuentes Rodríguez (born 14 August 1971) is Chilean former footballer that played as centre back in his years active. His last club was Coquimbo Unido.

International career
Fuentes made 24 appearances for Chile from 1998 to 2005. In addition, he played for Chile B against England B on 10 February 1998. Chile won by 2-1. 

As a curiosity, he popularized a striking play what was called Culebra (Snake) due to the fact he threw himself to the ground to block Ronaldo in the 2006 FIFA World Cup qualification match against Brazil on 6 June 2004.

Managerial career
While he was a player of Coquimbo Unido, he studied at the INAF (Football National Institute) and graduated as a Football Manager in 2014. So, he has coached the Youth Teams of both Coquimbo Unido and Cobreloa. In April 2021, he also was confirmed as the coach of Cobreloa women's team.

Honours

Club
Cobreloa
 Primera División de Chile (3): 2003 Apertura, 2003 Clausura, 2004 Clausura
Deportes Iquique
 Primera B (1): 2010
 Copa Chile (1): 2010

Individual
 Chilean Footballer of the Year (1): 2004

References

External links
 Fuentes at Football-Lineups

1971 births
Living people
People from Petorca
Chilean footballers
Chile international footballers
Cobreloa footballers
Coquimbo Unido footballers
Deportes Iquique footballers
Chilean Primera División players
Primera B de Chile players
2001 Copa América players
2004 Copa América players
Association football defenders
Chilean football managers